The 2020 season for the  cycling team began in January at the Tour Down Under.

Team roster 

Riders who joined the team for the 2020 season

Riders who left the team during or after the 2019 season

Season victories

National, Continental and World champions

Footnotes

References

External links
 

EF Education–EasyPost
2020 in American sports
2020 road cycling season by team